Colpospira is a genus of sea snails, marine gastropod mollusks in the family Turritellidae.

Species
Species within the genus Colpospira include:

 Colpospira accisa (Watson, 1881)
 Colpospira atkinsoni (Tate & May, 1900)
 Colpospira australis (Lamarck, 1822)
 Colpospira bundilla (Garrard, 1972)
 Colpospira circumligata (Verco, 1910)
 Colpospira congelata (Adams & Reeve, 1850)
 Colpospira cordismei (Watson, 1881)
 Colpospira curialis (Hedley, 1907)
 Colpospira decoramen (Iredale, 1936)
 Colpospira deliciosa (Watson, 1881)
 Colpospira guillaumei Iredale, 1924
 Colpospira joannae (Hedley, 1923)
 Colpospira mediolevis (Verco, 1910)
 Colpospira moretonensis (Garrard, 1972)
 Colpospira musgravia (Garrard, 1982)
 Colpospira quadrata (Donald, 1900)
 Colpospira runcinata (Watson, 1881) - type species of the genus Colpospira
 Colpospira sinuata (Reeve, 1849)
 Colpospira smithiana (Donald, 1900)
 Colpospira sophiae (Brazier, 1883)
 Colpospira swainsiana (Garrard, 1982)
 Colpospira translucida (Garrard, 1972)
 Colpospira wollumbi (Garrard, 1972)
 Colpospira yarramundi (Garrard, 1972)

References

External links

Turritellidae